The Hellenic Museum of Zagora, also known as the Greek Museum and the Old School of Rigas, is a historic school museum in Magnesia, Greece.

References

Museums with year of establishment missing
Museums in Thessaly
Pelion
School museums